The 1999–2000 session was a session of the California State Legislature.

Dates of sessions

Major events

Major legislation

Enacted

Pending or failed

Vetoed

Members
Skip to Assembly, below

Senate

  Democrats: 25
  Republicans: 15

The party affiliation and district numbers of Senators are listed after their names in this list.

President Pro Tem: John L. Burton (D-3)
Majority Leader: Richard Polanco (D-22)
Minority Leader: Ross Johnson (R-35) to April 27, 2000; Jim Brulte (R-31) from April 27, 2000

Assembly
Democrats: 50
Republicans: 29

Officers
Speaker Antonio Villaraigosa (D-45)
Speaker pro Tempore Fred Keeley (D-27)
Majority Floor Leader Kevin Shelley (D-12)
Minority Floor Leader Scott Baugh (R-67) from April 6, 1999
Rod Pacheco (R-64) to April 6, 1999
Chief Clerk  E. Dotson Wilson
Sergeant at Arms  Ronald Pane
Note: The Chief Clerk and the Sergeant at Arms are not Members of the Legislature

See also
 List of California state legislatures

External links
 Analysis of Bills

1999-2000
1999 in California
2000 in California
California
California